Mary Kay Ash (born Mary Kathlyn Wagner; May 12, 1918  – November 22, 2001) was an American businesswoman and founder of Mary Kay Cosmetics, Inc.  At her death, she had a fortune of $98 million, and her company had more than $1.2 billion in sales with a sales force of more than 800,000 in at least three dozen countries.

Early life
Mary Kay Ash, born Mary Kathlyn Wagner in Hot Wells, Harris County, Texas, was the daughter of Edward Alexander and Lula Vember Hastings Wagner. Her mother was trained as a nurse and later became a manager of a restaurant in Houston. Ash attended Dow Elementary School and Reagan High School in Houston, and graduated in 1934.

Ash married Ben Rogers at age 17. They had 3 children, Ben Jr., Marylin Reed, and Richard Rogers. While her husband served in World War II, she sold books door-to-door. After her husband's return in 1945, they divorced. She later married the brother of Mary C. Crowley, founder of Home Interiors and Gifts.

Career
Ash went to work for Stanley Home Products in 1939. Frustrated when passed over for a promotion in favor of a man that she had trained, Ash retired in 1963 and intended to write a book to assist women in business. The book turned into a business plan for her ideal company, and in the summer of 1963, Mary Kay Ash and her new husband, George Hallenbeck, planned to start Mary Kay Cosmetics. However, one month before Mary Kay and George started Beauty by Mary Kay, as the company was then called, George died of a heart attack. One month after George's death on September 13, 1963, when she was 45 years old with a $5,000 investment from her oldest son, Ben Rogers, Jr. and with her young son, Richard Rogers taking her late husband's place, Ash started Mary Kay Cosmetics.  The company started its original storefront operation "Beauty By Mary Kay"  in Dallas.  They used a five‐hundred‐square‐foot storefront with nine saleswomen signed up.  She copied the same “house party” model used by Stanley, Tupperware, and others. A Mary Kay representative would invite her friends over for free facials, then pitch the products. Profits rolled in, with double‐digit growth every year.

According to Gavenas:
 Mary Kay was a very visible, very active, and almost ridiculously feminine‐looking role model: a God‐fearing, hard‐working, immaculately groomed mother of three who was doing everything within her power to see other women get ahead, and who loved mentoring so much that she referred to her saleswomen as her “daughters.” Also unlike Avon, Mary Kay made her saleswomen more profit per unit: a Mary Kay lipstick cost roughly double the price of an Avon lipstick and hence made twice the profit, while the home‐party format meant that several customers could be approached at once...Mary Kay made her company purposely inclusive, enabling her rapid expansion into Australia, South America, Europe, and Asia.

Awards
Both during her life and posthumously, Ash received numerous honors from business groups, including the Horatio Alger Award. In 1980, Ash received the Golden Plate Award of the American Academy of Achievement. Ash was inducted into the Junior Achievement U.S. Business Hall of Fame in 1996. A long-time fundraiser for charities, she founded the Mary Kay Ash Charitable Foundation to raise money to combat domestic violence and cancers affecting women. Ash served as Mary Kay Cosmetics' chairman until 1987 when she was named Chairman Emeritus. Fortune magazine recognized Mary Kay Inc. with inclusion in "The 100 best companies to work for in America." The company was also named one of the best 10 companies for women to work. Her most recent acknowledgments were the "Equal Justice Award" from Legal Services of North Texas in 2001, and "Most Outstanding Woman in Business in the 20th Century" from Lifetime Television in 1999.

Mary Kay Cosmetics, Inc.
Ash and her partners, which included her son, Richard, took the company public in 1968. In 1985, the company's board decided to take the company private again after seventeen years as a public company. Ash remained active in Mary Kay Cosmetics, Inc. until suffering a stroke in 1996. Richard Rogers was named CEO of Mary Kay Cosmetics, Inc. in 2001. At the time of Ash's death, Mary Kay Cosmetics had over 800,000 representatives in 37 countries, with total annual sales of over $200 million. As of 2014, Mary Kay Cosmetics has more than 3 million consultants worldwide and a wholesale volume in excess of 3 billion.

Books
Ash was the author of several books, including Mary Kay, an autobiography in 1994, Miracles Happen and You Can Have It All in 1995. Her first book called Mary Kay on People Management was published in 1984 and the publisher Nightingale Conant produced an audio program written by Ash with the same title as the book.

Death
Mary Kay Ash died on November 22, 2001. Mary Kay Ash is interred in the Sparkman-Hillcrest Memorial Park Cemetery in Dallas, Texas.

Notes

Further reading
 Gavenas, Mary Lisa. "Ash, Mary Kay" American National Biography (20080_ https://doi.org/10.1093/anb/9780198606697.article.1002284
 Gavenas, Mary Lisa. Mary Lisa Gavenas, Color Stories: Behind the Scenes of America's Billion‐Dollar Beauty Industry (2002). 
 Gross, Daniel. Forbes Greatest Business Stories of All Time (1996).
 Gheorghe, Ionescu Gh, and Negrusa Adina. "Some aspects about the life of the greatest female entrepreneur in American history, Mary Kay Ash." Annals of the University of Oradea, Economic Science Series 18.1 (2009): 47–57. online
 Ionescu, Gh, And Adina Negrusa. "Mary Kay Ash, The Greatest Female Entrepreneur In American History And Business Ethics." Management & Marketing 4.4 (2009). online
 Stefoff, Rebecca (1992) Mary Kay Ash: Mary Kay, a Beautiful Business Garrett Educational Corp., Ada, Okla., 
 Rozakis, Laurie (1993) Mary Kay: Cosmetics Queen Rourke Enterprises, Vero Beach, Fla., 
 Waggoner, Catherine Egley. "The emancipatory potential of feminine masquerade in Mary Kay cosmetics." Text and Performance Quarterly 17.3 (1997): 256–272.

Primary sources
 Ash, Mary Kay (1984) Mary Kay on people management New York, NY, Warner Books, Inc.
 Ash, Mary Kay (1994) Miracles Happen: Mary Kay Ash The Life and Timeless Principles of the Founder of Mary Kay Inc. Harper Collins Publishers, New York,; autobiography

External links 
 Mary Kay Cosmetics
 Films featuring Mary Kay Ash and Mary Kay, Inc. at the Texas Archive of the Moving Image

1918 births
2001 deaths
American women chief executives
American cosmetics businesspeople
Baptists from Texas
Businesspeople from Dallas
People associated with direct selling
People from Cypress, Texas
University of Houston alumni
Burials at Sparkman-Hillcrest Memorial Park Cemetery
American chief executives of fashion industry companies
20th-century American businesspeople
20th-century American businesswomen